Zdravko Mićević (born 1982, in Yugoslavia) is a Melbourne-based Serbian professional boxer, but is best known for his involvement in the death of former Australian cricketer David Hookes.

Boxing career
In 1996, at the age of 14, with only three amateur fights under his belt, Mićević became the Victorian amateur champion and was the runner-up in the Australian amateur championships. In the same year he also won a silver medal at the Australian Amateur Boxing League titles in Rockhampton. In 1998, aged 16, he won the Australian amateur junior welterweight title on the Gold Coast and was talked about as a possible prospect for the 2000 Olympic Games in Sydney, but from that point on he lost interest in the sport, eventually quitting it after his 25th amateur fight.

After the Hookes trial, boxing promoters began pressuring Mićević to fight professionally as soon as two weeks after the verdict was handed down, but it took Mićević 18 months after the verdict to agree to make his professional boxing debut. Mićević began his professional boxing career with a unanimous points decision in a six-round "main event" bout against Wes Ryder in a Light Heavyweight bout at the Darebin Community Sports Stadium in Reservoir, Melbourne, on 13 April 2007. Mićević later claimed the vacant Australian Light Heavyweight title in a bout with Joel Casey on 14 November 2008 in a ten-round unanimous points decision in Coburg. s.

David Hookes
On the night of 18 January 2004, Hookes went to the Beaconsfield Hotel in St Kilda, Melbourne, with members of the Victorian and South Australian cricket teams, to celebrate a win by Victoria over South Australia in a one-day match. Shortly after midnight, the party was asked to leave the hotel, though there are conflicting stories as to the reason.  It is also unclear whether the party left voluntarily or were forced to leave. The security staff (of which Mićević was a member) continued monitoring the behaviour of the party for a short distance outside the hotel, and there was an altercation in which Mićević physically struck Hookes. Witnesses gave highly conflicting testimony of what occurred and who started the fight, but what is not in doubt is that Hookes fell to the ground, hitting his head in the process, and going into cardiac arrest.  He was revived by paramedics but did not regain consciousness. He was taken to Melbourne's Alfred Hospital and placed on life support. Hookes was taken off life support on the evening of 19 January and died shortly afterwards.

Mićević was charged by Victoria Police with assault on the day of the incident; that charge was upgraded to manslaughter after Hookes's death. On 12 September 2005, Mićević was acquitted on the charge of Hookes's manslaughter. The jury had taken five days to come to its decision, after a two-week trial. An issue in the trial was conflicting statements given by witnesses. Throughout the trial, Mićević had maintained that Hookes had without provocation punched him twice, and he felt obliged to defend himself against a further attack. After the trial, Mićević expressed his condolences to Hookes's family and his regret that the incident had ever occurred. A civil suit against Mićević and the Beaconsfield Hotel's owners by Hookes's wife Robyn was withdrawn on 20 February 2007.

References

External links
 
"Boxer's golden dreams" - Melbourne The Age 20/1/04
"Micevic cleared of killing cricketer David Hookes" - ABC 12/9/05

1982 births
Living people
Serbian emigrants to Australia
Australian male boxers
People acquitted of manslaughter
Light-heavyweight boxers